The Airport Express is one of the lines of the Hong Kong MTR system. It links the urban area with the Hong Kong International Airport and the AsiaWorld–Expo exhibition and convention centre.

It is the only rail link to the airport's terminal. It runs parallel to the Tung Chung line, a traditional rapid transit line, from Hong Kong station to just south of the channel between Lantau Island and Chek Lap Kok, on which the airport was constructed. The line continues to the airport and terminates at AsiaWorld–Expo. The Tung Chung line terminates in the adjacent Tung Chung new town, with bus service to various areas at the airport, including the passenger terminals.

The journey from Hong Kong station to the airport takes 24 minutes. The line is coloured teal on MTR system maps.

History
In October 1989, the Hong Kong government decided to replace the over-crowded Kai Tak Airport, located in Kowloon, with a new airport to be constructed at Chek Lap Kok. The government also invited the Mass Transit Railway Corporation to build an express line to the airport. The project began when the Chinese and British governments settled the financial and land agreements in November 1994.

The Lantau Airport Railway was developed as two separate MTR lines, the Tung Chung line and the Airport Express, with the two lines sharing tracks in some sections. It cost HK$35.1 billion. The Airport Express began service on 6 July 1998, the opening date of the new Hong Kong International Airport. The line initially terminated at Airport station and the entire journey time was 23 minutes.

With the opening of Sunny Bay station on the Tung Chung line in June 2005, the total journey time between the Airport and Hong Kong stations was increased to 24 minutes. With the opening of AsiaWorld–Expo, the line was extended to AsiaWorld–Expo station on 20 December 2005 and a journey on the entire route takes 28 minutes.

Route
The Airport Express line runs from Hong Kong station in Central, crosses under the harbour to West Kowloon and stops at Kowloon station. The line then runs along the western side of the Kowloon peninsula, crosses over the Rambler Channel rail bridge to Tsing Yi, and stops at Tsing Yi station. The line continues on the Lantau Link and runs parallel to the North Lantau Highway to Airport station before terminating at AsiaWorld–Expo station.

The line shares tracks with the Tung Chung line only in the cross-harbour tunnel and from the Lantau Link through the split before reaching the airport island. The two lines have their own tracks and platforms at all stations.

Features

The Airport Express offers more spacious and comfortable trains and stations than other MTR services. On the trains, there are luggage racks next to each door, and each seat is equipped with in-seat loudspeakers for current news, advertisements and announcements shown on LCD televisions in front.

In-town check-in
The Airport Express provides In-Town Check-In at the Hong Kong and Kowloon stations, where passengers on flights with selected airlines can receive boarding passes and check in their baggage before heading to the airport bags-free. Each train has a special baggage container car and the checked baggage is scanned in bulk by a Mechanised Automatic Explosive Detection System.

Baggage trolleys, wide fare gates, and free porter service are available at all stations except AsiaWorld–Expo to assist passengers with baggage.

Shuttle bus service
The Airport Express Shuttle Bus was a free service provided exclusively for Airport Express passengers at Hong Kong or Kowloon stations, connecting them with major hotels in the Western District though Quarry Bay on Hong Kong Island and the Yau Tsim Mong District and Hung Hom station in Kowloon. Before boarding, proof of eligibility had to be shown, including Airport Express train ticket (Single Journey, Same Day Return, Round Trip, Airport Express Travel Pass), Airline ticket / boarding pass, Airport Staff Octopus card, AsiaWorld–Expo entry pass or event ticket. However, this service was discontinued from 30 June 2020 due to low ridership caused by the COVID-19 pandemic.

On-board WiFi and charging service
WiFi are available on all Airport Express cars, while charging service are assigned on first and last cars. USB and electric socket are provided for charging mobile electronics.

Graphic identity
The Airport Express visual identity, which includes the logo, vehicle livery, signage, route maps and passenger information, was created in 1999 by Lloyd Northover, the British design consultancy founded by John Lloyd and Jim Northover.

Fare structure

Fares on the Airport Express are substantially higher than main line fares; a separate fare system is used for this line. Single trip or same-day return trips between the Hong Kong, Kowloon and Tsing Yi stations to Airport station cost HK$115, HK$105 and HK$70 respectively. Return tickets within 30 days cost HK$205, HK$185, and HK$120 respectively. Tickets are available at all MTR stations and the MTR online booking service. Although no entry gates are provided at Airport station, passengers must still buy tickets from the ticket machines located in the Arrivals Hall, on platform 1 of the airport before boarding the train or at destination platforms.

Various discounts and rewards programmes are available, such as Group Ticket Discount, free taxi connections, Rewarding programme, Asia Miles programme, etc. Passengers may also buy discounted tickets from local travel agents. Discounts are available for groups of two to four people. Hong Kong residents can also obtain discount coupons, such as those sent from credit card companies. Discounted fares are available to airport staff to encourage commuting on the Airport Express.

Same-day return discount will be given to Octopus card users who have stayed in AsiaWorld–Expo for at least one hour. The discounted fare costs HK$72, HK$64, and HK$42 from Hong Kong, Kowloon, and Tsing Yi stations respectively, and includes a free connection with other MTR lines. A single trip from the Airport to AsiaWorld–Expo is HK$5.

Given their separate fair structure, Airport Express journeys require an out-of-system transfer if coming from or going to other MTR lines that call at the same or connected stations (e.g. coming from Central towards Hong Kong station or transferring between Airport Express and Tung Chung line trains).  However, Airport Express passengers using Octopus cards can connect with all other MTR lines for free in conjunction with the Airport Express journey within one hour of arrival at an Airport Express station.

In March 2010, the MTR began to replace the magnetic tickets used for single, group, and multiple journey tickets with new "smart tickets" that contain a memory chip. The new system was in full operation by 5 June 2010.

Due to the high fares and small catchment areas of the Airport Express stations, some travellers may instead choose to either use the cheaper, local Tung Chung line combined with a bus route, or make their entire journey by bus. Patronage on the Airport Express is cannibalised by the Tung Chung line running mostly on the same track.

Morning Express Service
The Morning Express Service is a special promotional service, allowing passengers from Tsing Yi and Kowloon stations to travel to Hong Kong station to get to work daily (excluding Sundays and public holidays) from 7am to 10am for HK$20.

Operation and stations
Before the COVID-19 pandemic, Airport Express services operated every 10 minutes from the start of service (05:54 from Airport and 05:50 from Hong Kong) and every 12 minutes from 23:28 (from Airport) and 00:00 (from Hong Kong) until the last service 00:48.  Train service is currently reduced until further notice as patronage has not yet recovered. As of Nov 5, 2022, train service is every 15-20 minutes all day. 

The Airport Express, along with other MTR metro lines, is monitored by the Operations Control Centre in Tsing Yi.

Rolling stock
The Airport Express is served by 11 CAF-Stock trains built and assembled by Construcciones y Auxiliar de Ferrocarriles in Spain while Adtranz contributed control and traction equipment. These trains were made up of seven cars until 2003. To cope with the extra traffic demand derived from the opening of AsiaWorld-Expo station, an additional car was added to each train to form a total of eight cars. If future demand increases, trains on the AEL are capable of running with ten cars.

The train interiors saw their first refurbishment in 2008, after ten years in service. The grey seat covers were replaced with purple and green ones, and a new indigo carpet was installed. The interior was updated yet again in 2020, and new seat covers featuring the blue and aquamarine AEL logos and a grey wave pattern will be paired with synthetic leather head rests.

Stations
This is a list of the stations on the Airport Express line.

List

Use in media
In late 1998, Leon Lai showed a music video of MTR's Airport Express line for the song "Happy 2000", which includes the interior of the A-Train.

Design limitations
When British Hong Kong was planning to build the Airport Railway (Tung Chung line and Airport Express) in the 1990s, which was a few years before the handover to China, the Chinese government raised concerns about the effect of the project on the territory's fiscal reserves, which eventually forced the Hong Kong government to reduce the cost of the Airport Railway. The resulting changes made to the design imposed limitations on the level of service on the line.

 The airport rail link was originally designed to accommodate four tracks, two each for the Airport Express and Tung Chung line. It was later reduced to two tracks where both services share the same trackage. As a result, signal failures can affect both services.
 The Lantau Link section of the line (consisting of the Tsing Ma Bridge, Ma Wan Viaduct, and Kap Shui Mun Bridge) only allows one train to pass through each direction at the same time, raising the minimum headway between trains to 2 minutes 15 seconds. As a result, some Tung Chung line trains terminate at Tsing Yi during peak hours, instead of travelling the entire line.
 The signalling system is not capable of giving priority to Airport Express trains; as a result, Tung Chung line trains stopping at Sunny Bay station frequently impede Airport Express trains, which do not serve the station.
 The power supply system restricts the number of trains running between Kowloon and Lai King stations. The system can accommodate a maximum of one Airport Express train and two Tung Chung trains travelling in both directions at one time. The minimum headway on this section of the line is 3 minutes 30 seconds.

See also
 List of places in Hong Kong
 Transport in Hong Kong
 Delhi Airport Metro Express
 Hyderabad Airport Express Metro

References

External links

 

 
1432 mm gauge railways in Hong Kong
Immersed tube tunnels in Hong Kong
MTR lines
Railway lines opened in 1998
Transport in Hong Kong
Airport rail links in China